The Trinity Neighborhood House is a historic brick townhouse at 406 Meridian Street located in the Eagle Hill section of East Boston, Massachusetts.

History
The house was built in 1847 for entrepreneur Noah Sturtevant and was thus named the Noah Sturtevant House.  In 1917, it was named the Trinity Neighborhood House and Day Nursery.  Since 1888, it operated as a social service center and philanthropy of Trinity Church. The building is now owned by Neighborhood of Affordable Housing, Inc. and is a 16-unit single resident occupancy (SRO) facility for the formerly homeless.

The House had long been a beneficiary of many notable events.  On November 19, 1957, comedian Anna Russell held a concert at Jordan Hall in Boston to benefit the House. On May 8, 1958, noted archaeologist Byron Khun de Prorok gave a fundraising lecture at the New England Mutual Hall.  On February 4, 1960, a screening of the film Sweet Love Remember'd starring Margaret Sullavan was scheduled to benefit the House, but due to her untimely passing, the show was cancelled.  The show was replaced with Laurence Olivier's The Tumbler.

In 1981, the building was designated a Boston Landmark by the Boston Landmarks Commission and it was later added to the National Register of Historic Places in 1992.

See also 
 National Register of Historic Places listings in northern Boston, Massachusetts

References

External links
 Profile at Bostonian Society
 City of Boston, Landmarks Commission. Trinity Neighborhood House, 1981

Houses completed in 1847
Buildings and structures on the National Register of Historic Places in Massachusetts
Houses in Boston
National Register of Historic Places in Boston
Historic district contributing properties in Massachusetts
1847 establishments in Massachusetts
Landmarks in East Boston